Maja Livadh (Livadički Breg) is a mountain peak of the Šar Mountains. Livadički Breg forms the boundary between Kosovo and North Macedonia.

External links
Location and images

Notes and references

Notes:

References:

Two-thousanders of Kosovo
Two-thousanders of North Macedonia
Šar Mountains